The winners of the Vancouver Film Critics Circle Award for Best Supporting Actress are listed below.

Winners and nominees

2000s

2010s

2020s

References

Vancouver Film Critics Circle Awards
Film awards for supporting actress